Pure Gold may refer to:
 Pure Gold (Elvis Presley album), 1975
 Pure Gold (Glenn Miller album), 1975
 Pure Gold, a series of budget priced "Greatest Hits" compilation albums and popular LP reissues from several RCA Records recording artists, issued during the mid to late 1970s
 Pure Gold (various artists compilation album), 1973
 "Pure Gold" (song), a 2005 song by Earth, Wind & Fire
 "Pure Gold", a song by Ringo Starr from the album Ringo's Rotogravure
Pure gold, see carat (purity)
 Puregold, a supermarket in the Philippines
 Classic Hits (Cumulus radio network), a satellite radio format once called Pure Gold